In music, Op. 38 stands for Opus number 38. Compositions that are assigned this number include:

 Barber – Piano Concerto
 Brahms – Cello Sonata No. 1
 Busoni – Comedy Overture
 Chopin – Ballade No. 2
 Dvořák – Moravian Duets
 Elgar – The Dream of Gerontius
 Górecki – Beatus Vir
 Holst – Ode to Death
 Kabalevsky – Preludes
 Khachaturian – Piano Concerto
 Mendelssohn - Songs without Words, Book III
 Prokofiev – Piano Sonata No. 5
 Schoenberg – Chamber Symphony No. 2
 Schumann – Symphony No. 1
 Stanford – Three Latin Motets
 Strauss – Enoch Arden
 Tchaikovsky – Six Romances, Opus 38